Sea of Mystery is a 1981 role-playing game adventure for Tunnels & Trolls published by Flying Buffalo.

Plot summary
Sea of Mystery is a solo adventure in which the player character has encounters on the high seas, including pirates, slave galleys, and storms.

Reception
Russ Williams reviewed Sea of Mystery in The Space Gamer No. 49. Williams commented that "The situations are quite varied. I found one or two a bit hard to swallow, and some seemed contrived. However, it is basically a good, solid adventure with a welcome change in format from most other Flying Buffalo solo dungeons. I recommend it."

Reviews
 Different Worlds #15 (Oct., 1981)

References
 

Role-playing game supplements introduced in 1981
Tunnels & Trolls adventures